Primitivo Soul! is an album by American saxophonist Sonny Stitt, recorded in 1963 and issued on Prestige Records in 1964.

Track listing
All compositions by Sonny Stitt except as indicated
"Slave Maidens" (Mussapere) - 7:34
"Baion Baby" - 4:40
"Estrellita" (Frank La Forge, Manuel Ponce) - 5:08
"Blue Blood Ritual" - 6:10
"Island Shout" - 4:30
"Barefoot Ball" - 6:13

Personnel
Sonny Stitt - alto saxophone
Ronnie Mathews - piano
Leonard Gaskin - bass
Herbie Lovelle - drums
Marcelino Valdez - congas
Osvaldo "Chihuahua" Martinez - bongos

References

Prestige Records albums
Sonny Stitt albums
1964 albums